The 1990 GP Ouest-France was the 54th edition of the GP Ouest-France cycle race and was held on 21 August 1990. The race started and finished in Plouay. The race was won by Bruno Cornillet of the Z–Tomasso team.

General classification

References

1990
1990 in road cycling
1990 in French sport